The Keokuk-Hamilton bridge is a steel girder, 4-lane bridge from Keokuk, Iowa to Hamilton, Illinois. It carries U.S. Route 136 across the Mississippi River. It also has fully fenced off pedestrian walkway.

The Keokuk–Hamilton Bridge was built in 1985, taking over automobile traffic from the Keokuk Rail Bridge (though the latter bridge still carries rail traffic).

During the Great Flood of 1993, the rising Mississippi temporarily made the Keokuk–Hamilton Bridge inaccessible from the Illinois side of the river; later, gravel was layered over the threatened section of U.S. 136 to raise its level and keep the road and bridge accessible for the remaining flood period.  More recently, during the 2008 Midwest floods, the Illinois access was again threatened, but this time gravel was applied and the road level raised before it was rendered completely impassable; only temporary closings were required to allow road workers to complete the job. The Illinois Department of Transportation (IDOT) and WL Miller Co., a large concrete, quarry and asphalt company, put over 26,000 tons of rock on the eastbound lanes. The bridge approach was lifted about 4–6 feet in some areas. During the cleanup, some of the fairly new road was damaged, and IDOT is considering repaving the eastbound lanes from the bridge to Pats Pit Stop.  During the Mississippi River Floods of 2019, the bridge was once again closed.

See also
List of crossings of the Upper Mississippi River
Lock and Dam No. 19

References

 Weeks, John. "US-136 Bridge, Keokuk, IA". http://www.johnweeks.com/upper_mississippi/pagesB/umissB12.html. Retrieved January 18, 2006.

External links

Bridges over the Mississippi River
Road bridges in Illinois
Bridges of the United States Numbered Highway System
U.S. Route 136
Bridges completed in 1985
Buildings and structures in Keokuk, Iowa
Buildings and structures in Hancock County, Illinois
Bridges in Lee County, Iowa
Road bridges in Iowa
Steel bridges in the United States
Girder bridges in the United States
1985 establishments in Iowa
1985 establishments in Illinois
Interstate vehicle bridges in the United States